Ciego Montero is a Cuban brand of bottled water, part of Nestlé Waters, owned by the Cuban society Los Portales. Based in the village of Arriete-Ciego Montero, it produces the homonym water and soft drinks (refrescos) as the Gaseosa or the tuKola.

History
Production of Ciego Montero began in Guane, a town in Pinar del Río Province, a few years after the foundation of the Los Portales S.A.

Products

See also

List of Nestlé brands
List of bottled water brands
List of soft drinks by country

References

External links

Cuban brands
Cuban drinks
Nestlé brands
Bottled water brands